Dirk II may refer to:

 Dirk II, Count of Holland (920/930 – 988)
 Dirk II van Brederode (± 1256 – 1318)